Khrami Hydro Power Plant I and II is a large power plant in Georgia that has 4 turbines with a nominal capacity of 55 MW each having a total capacity of 220 MW.

See also

 List of power stations in Georgia (country)
 Energy in Georgia (country)

References

Hydroelectric power stations in Georgia (country)
Inter RAO

cs:Calkská přehradní nádrž